The Church of Jesus Christ of Latter-day Saints is the second-largest religious denomination in Arizona, behind the Roman Catholic Church. In 2021, the church reported 438,249 members in Arizona, about 6% of the state's population. According to the 2014 Pew Forum on Religion & Public Life survey, roughly 5% of Arizonans self-identify most closely with the Church of Jesus Christ of Latter-day Saints.

History

Mormon Battalion

The first presence of Latter-day Saints in Arizona was the Mormon Battalion. They marched through what is now southern Arizona in 1846 on the way to California as part of the Mexican–American War. They encountered wild cattle bulls and killed several of them in defense. They passed through Tucson (then a town of 400–500 inhabitants) causing an attachment of Mexican Forces to flee. They camped at the mouth of the Gila River before entering California.

Northern Arizona settlements
The next time Latter-day Saints entered the area was in 1858 and 1859, when Jacob Hamblin and his companions camped at Pipe Spring in the northwestern part of present-day Arizona. They did this while journeying to and from their missions among the Moqui (Hopi) Indians east of the Colorado River.

During the 1860s and 1870s, LDS parties explored portions of the area searching for possible settlement sites. Also during this period, isolated ranches and small Mormon settlements were established at Short Creek (now Colorado City), Pipe Spring, Beaver Dam and neighboring Littlefield, and Lee's Ferry, all in the area between the Utah border and the Grand Canyon known as the Arizona Strip.

The first effort at large-scale LDS colonization came in March 1873 when a group of Latter-day Saints was sent from Utah to the Little Colorado River drainage under the direction of Horton D. Height. The colonizers turned back, discouraged by the poor prospects, but a few returned the following year and began farming among the Native Americans at Moencopi. Local hostilities forced the colonists to leave again after a month. A year later, James S. Brown led another small colonizing group that successfully settled at Moencopi, then began exploring the surrounding area. Following these explorations, a large group of settlers, led by Lot Smith, arrived in the spring of 1876 and established four settlements on the Little Colorado, which they called Ballenger's Camp (later renamed Brigham City), Sunset, Obed and Allen City (later renamed St. Joseph, and then Joseph City), along with a support settlement near Mormon Lake with a sawmill, dairy and tannery.

Central and southern Arizona settlements

Daniel W. Jones was commissioned by Brigham Young to start a Mormon colony within the Salt River Valley of the Arizona Territory. The settlement party arrived at what would become Lehi, Arizona in March 1877. Jones' invitation to local Native Americans to live with them became a point of controversy, and half of the initial colony left, moving on to found St. David, Arizona. In February 1878 the First Mesa Company arrived in Lehi.  Rather than accepting an invitation to settle at Jones' settlement, they moved to the top of the mesa, and founded Mesa, Arizona. They dug irrigation canals, incorporating the original Hohokam canals in some places, and within a couple of months water was flowing through them.

Pima was founded in 1879 by Mormon settlers relocating from Forrest Dale, after that location was declared to be on tribal land. Originally named Smithville, it was unlike other Mormon settlements of the era, not being planned by the leaders of the church. Joseph K. Rogers was the first branch president at Pima, being appointed to this office before the settlers arrived. The branch was organized into a ward in 1880. In 1930 the total population of Pima was 980, 666 of whom were LDS, and a total of 1,260 people resided within the Pima ward boundaries.

County Statistics

List of LDS Church adherents in each county as of 2010 according to the Association of Religion Data Archives: Note: Each county adherent count reflects meetinghouse location of congregation and not by location of residence. The census count reflects location of residence, which may skew percent of population where adherents reside in a different county as their congregational meetinghouse.

Missions

On March 7, 1943, the Navajo-Zuni Mission was organized, and specialized with teaching Native Americans in their language.  This was renamed the Southwest Indian Mission on January 1, 1949, and again the New Mexico-Arizona Mission on October 10, 1972. It was discontinued and transferred into the Arizona Phoenix Mission on July 1, 1984.

On August 1, 1969, the Arizona Mission was organized from the California South Mission, and was renamed the Arizona Tempe Mission on June 20, 1974.

As of February 2023, Arizona was now home to six missions.

Also, the Nevada Las Vegas Mission, the New Mexico Farmington Mission, and the Utah St George Mission covers portions of the state.

Temples

On October 23, 1927, the Mesa Arizona Temple was dedicated. Until that time, members had traveled to the St. George Temple. Because of all the bridal parties that traversed the trail during the early years, the wagon road between St. George and the Arizona settlements became known as the Honeymoon Trail. The Mesa Arizona Temple was the first temple in the Church to be rededicated (on April 15, 1975) after extensive remodeling and enlarging to accommodate increased attendance.

On March 3, 2002, a second Arizona temple was dedicated in Snowflake.  Since then, a third, The Gila Valley Arizona Temple has been dedicated in Central, Arizona and three additional temples have been dedicated in Gilbert, Phoenix, and Tucson.

Communities 
Latter-day Saints have had a significant role in establishing, settling, and/or populating communities within the "Mormon Corridor", including the following in Arizona:

 Beaver Dam
 Brigham City (ghost town)
 Central
 Eagar
 Fredonia
 Gilbert
 Heber-Overgaard
 Joseph City
 Layton (absorbed by Safford)
 Lee's Ferry
 Lehi (annexed by Mesa)
 Littlefield
 Maryvale in Phoenix
 Mesa
 Mormon Lake
 Obed (ghost town)
 Pomerene
 Pima
 Pine
 Pipe Spring
 Queen Creek
 Safford
 Scottsdale
 St. David
 St. Johns
 Snowflake
 Sunset (ghost town)
 Taylor
 Thatcher
 Tuba City
 Wilford
 Woodruff

Notable people 

 Matt Salmon
 John K. Carmack
 Jake Flake
 Jeff Flake
 William J. Flake
 Francis M. Gibbons
 Jacob Hamblin
 Charles E. Jones (judge)
 Daniel Webster Jones (Mormon)
 David Patten Kimball
 Spencer W. Kimball
 Rex E. Lee
 Evan Mecham
 Fred Mortensen
 Charles Sreeve Peterson
 Miles Park Romney
 Eric B. Shumway
 Jesse N. Smith
 Lot Smith
 Delbert L. Stapley
 David King Udall
 Ida Hunt Udall
 Udall family
 Bob Worsley

See also 

 Religion in Arizona
 Aztec Land & Cattle Company (1884–1902)
 Mormon colonies in Mexico
 Mormon Corridor
 State of Deseret
 The Church of Jesus Christ of Latter-day Saints membership statistics (United States)
 John Willard Young

References

Further reading
Academic
 
 
 
 
 
 
 
 
 

News
 

Other

External links
 ComeUntoChrist.org Latter-day Saints Visitor site
 The Church of Jesus Christ of Latter-day Saints Official site

Church of Jesus Christ of Latter-day Saints